Fisayo Mubarak Adarabioyo (born 1 February 1995) is an English former professional footballer who played as a striker.

Club career

Early career
Adarabioyo started his career at Manchester City, before moving to Birmingham City. After his release by Birmingham in March 2013, he went on trial with Manchester United in July and August 2013, but failed to earn a contract.

He joined St Johnstone on January transfer deadline day of 2014, before signing for Crystal Palace later the same year. He did not make a senior appearance for any of these four clubs.

Non-League football
Adarabioyo made his first appearance in senior football for Macclesfield Town, coming off the bench against Aldershot Town, having signed for them on 25 September 2015. After his release by Macclesfield Town, Adarabioyo joined National League North side AFC Fylde, where he made one appearance, coming off the bench against Curzon Ashton.

NAC Breda
On 16 August 2016, Adarabioyo signed a two-year deal with Eerste Divisie side NAC Breda. He made his debut 6 days later, on 22 August, coming on as a substitute for Manchester City loanee Brandon Barker. He scored his first goal for the club on 16 September, in the 94th minute of a 4–2 win over RKC Waalwijk. He was released by the club in 2018.

FC U Craiova 1948
On 22 February 2019 he signed a contract with Romanian Liga III club FC U Craiova 1948. After two matches, he left the club.

Return to non-league
In February 2020, Adarabioyo joined Northern Premier League side Warrington Town, making three appearances. The following season, he featured for National League North side Curzon Ashton. After appearing once for Curzon Ashton on the bench, Adarabioyo joined National League side Altrincham. By August 2021, he was playing for Ashton United.

Personal life
Fisayo is the brother of current Fulham player Tosin Adarabioyo.

Career statistics

References

External links
 
 Non league stats via FWP

1995 births
Living people
English footballers
English expatriate footballers
Manchester City F.C. players
Birmingham City F.C. players
St Johnstone F.C. players
Crystal Palace F.C. players
Macclesfield Town F.C. players
AFC Fylde players
NAC Breda players
FC U Craiova 1948 players
National League (English football) players
Eerste Divisie players
Expatriate footballers in the Netherlands
Black British sportspeople
English people of Nigerian descent
Footballers from Greater London
Association football forwards
English expatriate sportspeople in the Netherlands
Expatriate footballers in Romania
English expatriate sportspeople in Romania
Warrington Town F.C. players
Northern Premier League players
Curzon Ashton F.C. players
Ashton United F.C. players